Hot Country is a 24-hour music format produced by Westwood One. Its playlist is composed of country music released from the late 1990s to the present.  Core artists include Luke Bryan, Lady A (formerly known as Lady Antebellum), Blake Shelton, Zac Brown Band, Keith Urban and Taylor Swift among others.

Its competitors were "Country Today" by Waitt, CD Country, True 24-Hour Country, and U.S. Country by Jones; however those assets were absorbed by Triton Media Group, leaving ABC Radio's Today's Best Country and Real Country the only competitors. CD Country was consolidated into this satellite feed as of early 2009. Country Today is now a locally customized version of sister network Mainstream Country.

Westwood One has rebranded this network as Hot Country Today for a short time as part of Dial Global's revamped satellite format line-up, but then reverted to its previous name.

Westwood One offers this format only in a Total version, not in a Local version.

References

External links 
Hot Country - Info from Westwood One

American radio networks
Country radio stations in the United States